Temperature cycling (or temperature cycle) is the process of cycling through two temperature extremes, typically at relatively high rates of change. It is an environmental stress test used in evaluating product reliability as well as in manufacturing to catch early-term, latent defects by inducing failure through thermal fatigue.

External links 

Temperature Cycling (JEDEC Standard No. 22-A104D)

Environmental testing